Liu Qichao (born in Shandong) is a Chinese-born  American musician. He graduated from the Shanghai Conservatory of Music. He now lives in Los Angeles.

Instruments
Liu performs on an array of traditional Chinese instruments, including wind instruments: dizi, suona, sheng, bawu, xun, and xiao; stringed instruments: erhu, guzheng, and sanxian; and percussion: Chinese drums, cymbals, gongs, and woodblocks.

Performances
In addition to his traditional performances, he has also worked in cross-cultural projects, collaborating with the Kronos Quartet, Jon Jang and the Pan Asian Arkestra, and the African Chinese Sextet featuring flutist James Newton. Due to his special interest in jazz, he has become associated with the Asian American jazz movement. Liu also leads his own ensemble, Chi Music.

Works
In the 1970s, a revival for the zheng instrument came about in China, as asked for by the government. Qichao wrote a zheng composition during the period called Caoyuan Yingxiong Xiao Jiemei ("The Heroic Sisters from the Grassland").

Legacy
A book was written by Weihua Zhang titled Music making as an expression of a changing Asian American identity: the music of Liu Qichao and Lee Pui Ming that prominently featured Qichao and his music.

Personal life
His wife was the late Zhang Yan (张燕, 1945–1996), a guzheng player.

References

External links
Liu Qi-Chao page from Ancient Future site

Year of birth missing (living people)
Living people
Chinese expatriates in the United States
Chinese flautists
Erhu players
Guzheng players
Musicians from California
Musicians from Shandong
People's Republic of China musicians